Morten Bøe (born 7 December 1971 in Sandefjord), is a Norwegian athlete who competes in compound archery. He has won four career medals at the World Championships, including a gold medal in 2001.

References

1971 births
Living people
Norwegian male archers
World Archery Championships medalists
Competitors at the 2001 World Games
21st-century Norwegian people